Cristian Daniel Quintero Valero (born 14 October 1992 in Maracay) is a Venezuelan swimmer. He is a member of the Venezuela national team, and represented his country at the London 2012 Summer Olympics. Quintero won a silver medal at the 2010 Summer Youth Olympics for the 200 yard freestyle. He won gold medals in the 2010 South American Games as a part of the Venezuela's 400 meter and 800 meter freestyle relay teams. Quintero is currently a student athlete at the University of Southern California.

See also
 USC Trojans
 Venezuela at the Olympics

References

External links
  – University of Southern California athlete profile of Cristian Quintero

1992 births
Living people
Venezuelan male freestyle swimmers
Olympic swimmers of Venezuela
Swimmers at the 2012 Summer Olympics
Swimmers at the 2016 Summer Olympics
Swimmers at the 2010 Summer Youth Olympics
Swimmers at the 2015 Pan American Games
Swimmers at the 2011 Pan American Games
Pan American Games bronze medalists for Venezuela
Pan American Games medalists in swimming
South American Games gold medalists for Venezuela
South American Games silver medalists for Venezuela
South American Games bronze medalists for Venezuela
South American Games medalists in swimming
Central American and Caribbean Games gold medalists for Venezuela
Competitors at the 2010 South American Games
Competitors at the 2010 Central American and Caribbean Games
Swimmers at the 2019 Pan American Games
Central American and Caribbean Games medalists in swimming
Medalists at the 2011 Pan American Games
Sportspeople from Maracay
21st-century Venezuelan people